The Scorpion King film series consists of American sword and sorcery action adventure film and is a spin-off of The Mummy remake film series created by Stephen Sommers. The film series consists of one released theatrical film, four straight-to-home video releases, and an upcoming theatrical reboot.

Films

Future
In November 2020, a reboot of The Scorpion King film series was announced to be in development. Jonathan Herman will serve as screenwriter, with the plot taking place in modern-day and involving a contemporary adaptation of Mathayus of Akkad / Scorpion King. Dwayne Johnson will serve as producer alongside Dany Garcia and Hiram Garcia. The project will be a joint-venture production between Universal Pictures and Seven Bucks Productions.

Cast
 A  indicates the actor portrayed the role of a younger version of the character.
 A  indicates archive footage of the actor portraying the role was used.
 A dark gray cell indicates the character was not in the film.

Additional crew and production details

Video games
Two video game adaptations were released:
 The Scorpion King: Sword of Osiris (2002; Game Boy Advance)
 The Scorpion King: Rise of the Akkadian (2002; Nintendo GameCube and PlayStation 2)

References

External links
 
 
 
 
 

Film series introduced in 2002
Universal Pictures franchises
Scorpion King (film series)
 series
Action film series